Malcolm McKay may refer to:

Malcolm McKay (writer) (born 1947), British writer 
Malcolm McKay (politician) (1873-1928), Canadian politician

See also
 Malcolm Mackay (disambiguation)